Cazadero Dam was a dam on the Clackamas River, near the city of Estacada, Oregon, United States. Construction began in 1904, and it was put into service in 1907.

The original dam was destroyed by flood in 1965 and replaced with the Faraday Dam. A new dam bears the name.

See also
Cazadero, Oregon, a former station and post office near the dam's powerhouse.

References

External links
  from University of Washington Libraries Digital Collections
  during the Pacific Northwest flood of 1964, from Oregon Department of Transportation
 google maps to new dam
A photo of the new dam

Dams in Oregon
Buildings and structures in Clackamas County, Oregon
Dams completed in 1907
1907 establishments in Oregon
Demolished buildings and structures in Oregon
1965 disestablishments in Oregon